The 2023 Marshall Thundering Herd football team will represent Marshall University during the 2023 NCAA Division I FBS football season. The Thundering Herd will play their home games at the Joan C. Edwards Stadium in Huntington, West Virginia, and compete in the East Division of the Sun Belt Conference. The team is coached by third-year head coach Charles Huff

Previous season

The Thunderin Herd finished the 2022 season 9–4, 5–3 in Sun Belt play to finish in third place in the East Division. They beat UConn 28–14 in the Myrtle Beach Bowl.

Offseason

Coaching changes
On February 7th defensive coordinator Lance Guidry was hired University of Miami to be their defensive coordinator.

On February 9th the Thundering herd hired Jason Semore to be their defensive coordinator. He was previously the safties and special teams coach at Georgia Tech.

Schedule
The football schedule was announced February 24, 2023.

References

Marshall
Marshall Thundering Herd football seasons
Marshall Thundering Herd football